The 1979 Tulsa Golden Hurricane football team represented the University of Tulsa as a member of the Missouri Valley Conference (MVC) during the 1979 NCAA Division I-A football season. In their third year under head coach John Cooper, the Golden Hurricane compiled a 6–5 record. Tulsa played only two games against conference opponents,  Wichita State and New Mexico State, but neither game counted in the conference standings.

The team's statistical leaders included quarterback Bill Blankenship with 627 passing yards, Paul Roberson with 546 rushing yards, and Paul Johns with 408 receiving yards. Head coach John Cooper was later inducted into the College Football Hall of Fame.

Schedule

1980 NFL Draft

The following Golden Hurricane was selected in the 1980 NFL draft.

References

Tulsa
Tulsa Golden Hurricane football seasons
Tulsa Golden Hurricane football